Acer distylum, the lime-leaved maple or linden leaved maple, is a species of flowering plant in the family Sapindaceae, native to north Honshu Island of Japan. Its closest relative is Acer nipponicum, with which it is grouped in the Acer section Parviflora. The species is noted for its  unlobed leaves, the like of which are not found in any other maple species. The bark is grayish, and has a pink cast in young specimens. Acer distylum was first described by Philipp Franz von Siebold and Joseph Gerhard Zuccarini in 1845, and later brought to Europe by Charles Maries in 1879.

Distribution
Acer distylum is endemic to Japan, growing on fertile soils in the northern part of Honshu, but even there it is rather rare.

Habitat and ecology
Acer distylum can be found mostly in woodland or garden canopy. Acer distylum is a treelike shrub to 10 m tall under favorable conditions, otherwise a much smaller shrub, with yellow-gray branches that are rather densely branched. Charles Maries introduced it in 1879 to Great Britain for Veitch Nursery, although Siebold and Zuccarini made the description in 1845. It is rather rare in Great Britain, but good specimens can be found in several gardens and collections.

Morphology
Deciduous trees or large shrubs, small to medium height (5-10 m tall), yellow-gray branches that are rather densely branched. Leaves are undivided, deeply cordate, margins crenate, ovate, not lobed, 10-15 cm long and 5-8 cm wide, gray-green. Undersides pale green, shining and glabrous, pinkish gray when young. The fall color is yellow. Flowers are sepals hairy; discs lobed; stamens inserted between the lobes.

Flowers and fruit

Acer distylum has pale green inflorescences that are 7-10cm long, and flower in May to June, fruits 3-3.5cm. The flowers are monoecious. The flowers' sepals are hairy, discs lobed, and stamens inserted between the lobes. Yellow on very erect spikes, small, nodding from the erect pedicels. Fruits are borned on conspicuous erect racemes; nutlets with rounded wings about 3 cm long.

References

External links

distylum
Endemic flora of Japan
Plants described in 1845